Huntsville is an unincorporated community in Union Township, Randolph County, in the U.S. state of Indiana.

History
Huntsville was platted in 1834. The community was named for its founder, Miles Hunt.

Geography

References

Unincorporated communities in Randolph County, Indiana
Unincorporated communities in Indiana